LÉ Maev  was a  of the Irish Naval Service. She was named after Medb, the legendary queen of Connacht.

Maev was commissioned into Irish service in December 1946, and decommissioned in March 1972.

References

 

Former naval ships of the Republic of Ireland
Flower-class corvettes of the Irish Naval Service
Ships built by Harland and Wolff
1941 ships